Haemieup-seong is a fortress located in Haemi-eup near Seosan, South Chungcheong Province in South Korea. Haemi Castle was built between the 17th year of the reign of King Taejong (1417) and the 3rd year of Sejong the Great's reign in 1421 during the Joseon period. The fortress was completed in the 22nd year of the reign of King Seongjong. In January 1963, it was listed as South Korea's Historical Site No. 116 and was renovated in 1973. The castle was the background of the Donghak Rebellion in 1864. This fortress, originally built to protect against Japanese pirates, was a historical site where thousands of Catholics were executed during the French Invasion in 1866.

Facilities 
There's a historic culture festival held at Haemieup-seong. The theme is Seosan during the Joeseon period. The fortress has several facilities that include a natural eco park, horseback riding, shops and places to eat and drink, as well as gukgung and ssireum.

Operating Hours 
Summer season 05:00-21:00 / Winter season 06:00-19:00

See also 

Castles in Korea
Korean Architecture
 Korean-style fortresses in Manchuria
 Korean-style fortresses in Japan
 Cheolli Jangseong

References

External links
 Haemieup Castle
Cultural Heritage
Visit Korea

Buildings and structures in South Chungcheong Province
City walls in South Korea
Seosan